The 12th annual MTV Europe Music Awards were held at Pavilhão Atlântico,
Lisbon, Portugal. 

The show was opened by Madonna, performing "Hung Up". Other performers included Pussycat Dolls, The Black Eyed Peas, Robbie Williams and Foo Fighters.

Presenters included Anastacia, Jared Leto, John Legend, Sugababes and Brittany Murphy.

Nominations
Winners are in bold text.

Regional nominations
Winners are in bold text.

Performances

Pre show
John Legend - "Ordinary People / Number One" & "So High"

Main show
Madonna — "Hung Up"
Coldplay — "Talk"
The Pussycat Dolls — "Don't Cha"
Gorillaz — "Feel Good Inc."
Akon — "Belly Dancer (Bananza)"
Green Day — "Holiday"
Robbie Williams — "Tripping"
The Black Eyed Peas — "My Humps"
Foo Fighters — "D.O.A."
Shakira — "Don't Bother"
System of a Down — "B.Y.O.B."

Appearances 
Anastacia — presented Best Album
Sugababes — presented Best Pop
Sean Paul — presented Best Hip-Hop
Luís Figo and Nuno Gomes — presented Best Rock
Jared Leto — presented Best Alternative
Craig David — presented Best R&B
Nelly Furtado and Shaggy — presented Best Video
John Legend — presented Best Female
Madonna — presented Free Your Mind
t.A.T.u. — presented Best Male
Gael García Bernal and Diego Luna — presented Best New Act
Borat and Brittany Murphy — introduced Alison Goldfrapp
Alison Goldfrapp — presented Best Song
Borat and Brittany Murphy — introduced Shakira
Brittany Murphy — presented Best Group

See also
2005 MTV Video Music Awards

2005 in Portugal
MTV Europe Music Awards
2005
2000s in Lisbon
November 2005 events in Europe